Naihati Junction is a  Kolkata Suburban Railway  junction station on the Sealdah–Ranaghat line and Naihati–Bandel link. It is located in North 24 Parganas district in the Indian state of West Bengal.  It serves Naihati and the surrounding areas.

History
The Calcutta (Sealdah)-Kusthia line of Eastern Bengal Railway was opened to traffic in 1862. Eastern Bengal Railway worked on the eastern side of the Hooghly River, which in those days was unbridged.

In 1857, the Eastern Bengal Railway (EBR) was constituted to lay the railway tracks along the eastern bank of the Hooghly River up to Kushtia. The Jubilee Bridge linking Bandel and Naihati was opened on 21 February 1887, so that up country freight traffic could be transported to the Kolkata port.

Railway service
It is a part of the Kolkata Suburban Railway system. The journey takes about 20 minutes.

Station complex
The platform is very much well sheltered. It has many facilities including water and sanitation. There is a proper approach road to this station. Escalators were installed in 2019.

Electrification
The Sealdah–Ranaghat sector was electrified in 1963–65 and the Bandel–Naihati link in 1965–66.

Carriage and wagon depot
The carriage and wagon depot at Naihati handles such work as checking of air and vacuum brakes and repair of sick lines. Bangladesh bound trains are checked and repaired.

Coaching terminal
A new coaching terminal was proposed at Naihati in the rail budget for 2012–13. A museum in honour of Bankim Chandra Chatterjee has also been proposed.

Multifunctional complex
Indian Railways are planning for a multi-functional complex near Naihati railway station to provide rail users facilities such as shopping, food stalls and restaurants, book stalls, telephone booths, medicine and variety stores.

Sampreeti Bridge

Sampreeti Bridge has replaced the old British-era Jubilee Bridge built in 1887.

References

External links
  About Naihati
 Trains at Naihati
 

Railway stations in North 24 Parganas district
Sealdah railway division
Kolkata Suburban Railway stations
1862 establishments in India
Railway junction stations in West Bengal